A kleroterion was a randomization device used by the Athenian polis during the period of democracy to select citizens to the boule, to most state offices, to the nomothetai, and to court juries.

The kleroterion was a slab of stone incised with rows of slots and with an attached tube. Citizens' tokens—pinakia—were placed randomly in the slots so that every member of each of the tribes of Athens had their tokens placed in the same column. There was a pipe attached to the stone which could then be fed dice that were coloured differently (assumed to be black and white) and could be released individually by a mechanism that has not survived to posterity (but is speculated to be by two nails; one used to block the open end and another to separate the next die to fall from the rest of the dice above it.) When a die was released, a complete row of tokens (so, one citizen from each of the tribes of Athens) was either selected if the die was coloured one colour, or discarded if it was the alternate colour. This process continued until the requisite number of citizens was selected.

History 
Prior to 403 BCE, the courts published a schedule and the number of dikastes required for the day. Those citizens who wanted to be dikastes queued at the entrance of the court at the beginning of the court day. Originally, the procedure was based on a "first come, first serve" basis. Beginning in 403 BCE, Athenian allotment underwent a series of reforms, and from 370 BCE onwards, they employed the kleroterion.

Procedure 
In his Constitution of the Athenians, Aristotle gives an account of the selection of jurors to the dikastra. Each deme divided their dikastes into ten sections, which split the use of two kleroteria. Candidate citizens placed their identification token (pinaka) in the section's chest. Once each citizen who wished to become judge for the day placed their pinaka in the chest, the presiding archon shook the chest and drew out tokens. The citizen whose token was first drawn became the token inserter (empektes). The token inserter then pulled out tokens and inserted them into their corresponding sections. The kleroterion was divided into five columns, one column per tribe section (between two machines). Each row was known as a kanomides. Once the token inserter filled the kleroterion, the archon then placed a mix of black and white dice (kyboi) into the side of the kleroterion. The number of white dice was proportional to the number of jurors needed. The archon allowed the dice to fall through a tube on the side of the kleroterion and drew them one by one. If the die was white, the top row was selected as jurors. If the die was black, the archon moved on to the next row down from the top and repeated the process until all juror positions were filled for the day.

Scholarship 
The first significant examination of Athenian allotment procedures was James Wycliffe Headlam's Election by Lot, first published in 1891. Aristotle's Constitution of the Athenians, the text of which was first discovered in 1879 and first published as Aristotle's in 1890, became an important resource for scholars. Throughout the text, Aristotle makes references to a lottery system which was used to appoint government officials. 

Archaeologists first discovered kleroteria in the 1930s in the Athenian Agora, dating them to the second century BC. In Aristotle, the Kleroteria, and the Courts (1939), Sterling Dow gave an overview and analysis of the discovered machines. Contrary to previous scholars, who translated kleroterion as "allotment room," Dow reasoned that kleroterion cannot be translated to mean "room," as Aristotle writes: "There are five kanomides in each of the kleroteria. Whenever he puts in the kyboi, the archon draws lots for the tribe the kleroterion." Dow concluded that Aristotle's fourth-century description of the kleroterion applied to the second-century kleroterion.

In 1937, Dow published a catalog of his archaeological discoveries in the Athenian agora. He describes eleven ''kleroteria'c fragments:

See also 

 Sortition
 Lottery machine

References
 
 
 Orlandini, Alessandro (April 2018) https://www.academia.edu/36510282/KLEROTERION._simulation_of_the_allotment_of_dikastai. simulation of the allotment.

External links
 Patrice Masini, Le tirage au sort démocratique, CNRS Images (2017) (a short video by French scholars)
 Alessandro Orlandini, https://m.youtube.com/watch?v=gt9H7nbZjAw, (2018) (video of the procedure simulation)
 The Machine that Selected the Citizens of Athens

Ancient Greece
Democracy
Sampling (statistics)
Athenian democracy